Arlette Grosso (born 3 March 1937) is a French alpine skier. She competed in three events at the 1960 Winter Olympics.

References

External links
 

1937 births
Living people
French female alpine skiers
Olympic alpine skiers of France
Alpine skiers at the 1960 Winter Olympics
Sportspeople from Haute-Savoie